Lisa Schulte Moore is an American landscape ecologist. Schulte Moore is a professor of natural resource ecology and management at Iowa State University. In 2020 she received a $10 million USD grant to study anerobic digestion and its application to turning manure into usable energy. In 2021 she was named a MacArthur fellow.

Work
Moore has worked with farmers to develop resilient and sustainable agricultural practices and systems that take into consideration climate change, water quality and loss of biodiversity.

Moore has written on various ecological topics, including the ecological effects of fire on landscapes; soil carbon storage, biodiversity improvement, the effects of wind and fire on forests, among others.

Awards and honors
John D. and Katherine T. MacArthur Foundation Fellowship
 Citation for Leadership and Achievement, Council for Scientific Society Presidents (2022)

References

External links
 

American ecologists
Iowa State University faculty
Living people
MacArthur Fellows
Women ecologists
Year of birth missing (living people)